Institutional Investor may refer to:

 Institutional investor
 Institutional Investor (magazine)